Elisabeth Bauriedel (born 20 June 1939) is a German politician, representative of the Christian Social Union in Bavaria.

See also
List of Bavarian Christian Social Union politicians

References

Christian Social Union in Bavaria politicians
1939 births
Living people
Place of birth missing (living people)
20th-century German politicians